A reboot is the process of restarting a computer system.

Reboot may also refer to:

Arts, entertainment, and media 
 Reboot (fiction), to discard all previous continuity in a fiction series and start anew

Music
 Reboot (Brooks & Dunn album), 2019
 Reboot (London album), 2012
 ReBoot (Sam Brown album), 2000
 Reboot (Wonder Girls album), 2015
 Re-Boot: Live '98, a 1998 album by the band Front 242
 "Reboot" (song), by Tohoshinki, 2017
"[Reboot]", a single from the 2019 Waterparks album, Fandom

Television
 ReBoot, a Canadian CGI-animated television series which debuted in 1994
 ReBoot: The Guardian Code, a CGI / live-action reimagining of the 1994 series released in 2018
 Reboot (Adventure Time), a 2016 episode of Adventure Time
 Reboot (2022 TV series), a 2022 TV series

Other
 ReBoot (video game), a 1998 video game based on the television series
 Reboot (novel), a novel by Amy Tintera

See also 
 Booting
 Reset (disambiguation)
 Restart (disambiguation)
 Revival (television)